Touch the Sound is a soundtrack by Scottish percussionist Evelyn Glennie of the 2004 documentary film Touch the Sound by German filmmaker Thomas Riedelsheimer about Glennie, who is profoundly deaf.  It was released on CD in 2004 by German record label, Normal.

The soundtrack consists of musical improvisations by Glennie, solo and with other musicians, including English experimental musician Fred Frith. Glennie and Frith were filmed improvising in an abandoned sugar factory in Dormagen, Germany, and six of the tracks on the soundtrack were recorded in the factory. In 2007 Frith and Glennie released an album, The Sugar Factory which used material from those sessions.

Reception

In a review at AllMusic, Stephen Eddins gave the soundtrack four stars out of five, and said that "This is not a recording in which Glennie's virtuosity is on display, but one that showcases her sensitivity to the world around her, and that's a wonderful thing to hear."

Track listing

Source: Soundtrack liner notes.

Personnel
Fred Frith – bass guitar, guitar, percussion, vocals
Evelyn Glennie – drums, snare drum, marimba, percussion, sheet metal, tom-tom, waterphone, wind whistle
Horacio "El Negro" Hernandez – drums
Ondekoza – drums, taiko
Misa This – piano
Saikou This – violin
Jason "The Fogmaster" – foghorns
Roxane Butterfly – tap dancing
Source: AllMusic, Discogs

Production
Location sound engineering by Gregor Kuschel and Marc von Stuerler
Sugar factory recording (tracks 1, 2, 7, 8, 14, 19) by Jörg T. Schnabel and Patrik Höderrath
Sound Editing by Christoph von Schoenburg
Mixing by Hubertus Rath
Produced by Filmquadrat Munich and Skyline Edinburgh
Liner notes by Thomas Riedelsheimer
Source: AllMusic, Discogs

References

2004 soundtrack albums
Documentary film soundtracks